Liu Xiaobo (born 16 January 1984 in Beijing) is a Chinese taekwondo athlete. He competed at the 2008 and 2012 Summer Olympics, and won a bronze medal at the latter. Liu also won medals at the 2006 Asian Games and the 2008 and 2012 Asian Taekwondo Championships.

See also
China at the 2012 Summer Olympics#Taekwondo
Taekwondo at the 2012 Summer Olympics – Men's +80 kg

External links

References 

1984 births
Living people
Olympic taekwondo practitioners of China
Sportspeople from Beijing
Taekwondo practitioners at the 2008 Summer Olympics
Taekwondo practitioners at the 2012 Summer Olympics
Asian Games medalists in taekwondo
Olympic bronze medalists for China
Olympic medalists in taekwondo
Taekwondo practitioners at the 2006 Asian Games
Medalists at the 2012 Summer Olympics
Asian Games bronze medalists for China
Medalists at the 2006 Asian Games
Asian Taekwondo Championships medalists
21st-century Chinese people